The 1992 Western Kentucky Hilltoppers football team represented Western Kentucky University as an independent during the 1992 NCAA Division I-AA football season Led by fourth-year head coach Jack Harbaugh, the Hilltoppers compiled a record of 4–6. The team's captains were Richard Grice and Mark Lamberth.

Schedule

References

Western Kentucky
Western Kentucky Hilltoppers football seasons
Western Kentucky Hilltoppers football